Gaetano Stefano Bartolozzi (1757–1821) was an Italian engraver, art dealer, and merchant.  He was the son of the famous engraver Francesco Bartolozzi, a friend of Joseph Haydn, the husband of the outstanding pianist Theresa Jansen, and the father of the celebrated actress and theatre manager Lucia Elizabeth Vestris.

See also
Theresa Jansen Bartolozzi

References

1757 births
1821 deaths
Italian engravers
Burials at Kensal Green Cemetery
Bartolozzi family